Hampshire Township may refer to the following townships in the United States:

 Hampshire Township, Kane County, Illinois
 Hampshire Township, Clinton County, Iowa